79th Brigade may refer to:

 79th Air Assault Brigade (Ukraine)
 79th Brigade (United Kingdom)
 79th Infantry Brigade Combat Team (United States)

See also
 79th Division (disambiguation)
 79th Regiment (disambiguation)